Joey Lawrence is the debut album by American singer and actor Joey Lawrence, released on February 2, 1993, on MCA Records. It features a total of three singles; the biggest of which, the Lawrence co-written "Nothin' My Love Can't Fix", reached number 19 on the Billboard Hot 100.

Track listing

"I Can't Help Myself" (Axel Kroell; Mark Holden; Michael Price) – 4:24
"Nothin' My Love Can't Fix" (Joey Lawrence; Alexandra Forbes; Eric Beall) – 4:03
"Stay Forever" (Joey Lawrence; Ariel Shallit; Art Lafrentz Bacon; Nicholas Bacon) – 4:18
"Justa 'Nother Love Song" (Joey Lawrence; Michael Price; Richard Scher; Terry Lupton) – 4:20
"Night by Night" (Richard Scher; Steve Diamond) – 4:19
"I Like the Way (Kick da Smoove Groove)" (Joey Lawrence; Ariel Shallit; Lafrentz Bacon, Arthur) – 4:18
"In These Times" (Joey Lawrence; Elliot Wolff) – 4:17
"Anything for Love" (Ronald Spearman; Vassal Benford) – 4:04
"My Girl" (Joey Lawrence; Elliot Wolff) – 3:25
"Where Does That Leave Me" (Joey Lawrence; Allan Rich; Jud J. Friedman) – 4:46
"The Ways of Love" (Joey Lawrence; Ian Prince) – 4:33
"Read My Eyes" (Joey Lawrence; Russ Faith) – 3:26

Personnel
Joey Lawrence – main vocal
Maxi Anderson, Liz Constantine, Joey Diggs, Jim Gilstrap, Julia Waters, Oren Waters, Maxine Waters, Terry Wood, Monalisa Young, Terry Young – backing vocals
Steve Skinner – keyboards and programming
Jim Lang – keyboards
Steve Diamond, Dean Parks, Sheldon Reynolds – guitars 
Nathaniel Phillips – keyboards, drums
Richard Scher – drums
Ronald Spearman – percussion
Richard Elliott, Dave Koz – saxophone

Production
Produced by Steve Barri (1-6, 12), Eric Beall (2), Vassal Benford (8), Steve Diamond (5), Alexandra Forbes (2), Jud J. Friedman (10), Axel Kroell (1), Tony Peluso (1-6, 12), Ian Prince (11), Richard Scher (4, 5) Elliot Wolff (7, 9), Randy Nicklaus (additional production on 10), Joey Lawrence (3, associate producer on 12), Pat O'Conner (associate producer on 12), Julie Barri (assistant on 3)
Associate producers – Julie Barri, Joey Lawrence, Randy Nicklaus
Engineers – Ted Blaisdell, Martin Brass, Phil Brown, Jim Lang, Tony Peluso, Richard Scher, Joe "Gruvtek" Seta, Fred Tenny, Elliot Wolff
Assistant engineers – Benny Mouthon, Axel Nielhaus
Mixing – Ted Blaisdell, Victor Flores, Steve Peck, Tony Peluso
Mix assistant – Fred Kelly
Mastering – Steve Hall

Charts

References

1993 debut albums
MCA Records albums
New jack swing albums